Schoharie may refer to:

Schoharie County, New York, USA
Schoharie (town), New York, in the above county
Schoharie (village), New York, in the above town
Schoharie Creek, a stream in upstate New York, USA
Schoharie Valley, surrounding the above creek